Lány is a municipality and village in Chrudim District in the Pardubice Region of the Czech Republic. It has about 300 inhabitants.

Administrative parts
The village of Kozojedy is an administrative part of Lány.

References

External links

Villages in Chrudim District